Brian Dunning may refer to:
 Brian Dunning (cricketer) (1940–2008), New Zealand cricketer
 Brian Dunning (author) (born 1965), author and podcast host
 Brian Dunning (flautist) (born 1952), Irish jazz flute player